Mariano Hood (born 14 August 1973) is a retired left-handed professional Argentine tennis player who specialized in doubles.

In his career, Hood won 13 out of the 26 top level doubles finals he was in. He turned professional in 1993, and currently resides in his city of birth, Buenos Aires. He won $US806,888 in earnings and was coached by Daniel Orsanic. He won his first doubles title in Santiago, Chile in 1998 and Palermo in 2005 was his last title. On October 27, 2003, Hood reached his highest doubles ranking of World Number 20. He partnered either Sebastián Prieto or Lucas Arnold Ker to win most of his doubles titles, although he did have other partnerships as well.

Hood was banned by the ITF of the illegal use of Finasteride after he had made the French Open quarterfinals in 2005. He thus planned to retire from the professional circuit. Hood, however, made a comeback in 2008. He last played on the tour in 2009.

2008 comeback
In his first tournament of the year, he went to the semifinals with José Acasuso at the 2008 Copa Telmex. A week later, Hood teamed with Eduardo Schwank to win the Santiago, Chile Challenger on the ITF Men's Circuit. After two weeks' early losses alongside fellow Argentine partners in Challenger tournaments, he teamed with Guillermo Coria to reach the Naples Challenger semifinals, and then with Luis Horna to reach the Monza Challenger semifinals. Directly after this, he won a second title, at Chiasso located in Switzerland with Alberto Martín in a Challenger event. Two weeks later, a third Challenger triumph arrived with a victory over Marc Fornell and Caio Zampieri alongside Guillermo García López. After a few more tournaments, he received a wildcard entry with Rafael Nadal at the 2008 Queen's Club Championships.

ATP career finals

Doubles: 26 (13 titles, 13 runner-ups)

ATP Challenger and ITF Futures finals

Singles: 2 (0–2)

Doubles: 38 (22–16)

Performance timeline

Doubles

See also
List of sportspeople sanctioned for doping offences

References

External links

Argentine male tennis players
Argentine people of English descent
Argentine sportspeople in doping cases
Doping cases in tennis
Tennis players from Buenos Aires
1973 births
Living people